Rareș Ștefan Dogaru (born 11 December 2003) is a Romanian professional footballer who plays as a forward.

Career Statistics

Club

References

External links
 
 
 Rareș Dogaru at frf-ajf.ro

2003 births
Living people
People from Breaza
Romanian footballers
Association football forwards
Liga I players
CS Gaz Metan Mediaș players